is a Japanese manga series written and illustrated by Shuji Takeya. It was serialized in Kodansha's seinen manga magazine Monthly Morning Two from July 2017 to May 2018, with its chapters collected in three tankōbon volumes.

Publication
Written and illustrated by Shuji Takeya, Hella Chill Monsters was serialized in Kodansha's seinen manga magazine  from July 22, 2017, to May 22, 2018. Kodansha collected its chapters in three tankōbon volumes, released from December 21, 2017, to July 23, 2018.

In July 2022, Kodansha USA announced that they had licensed the manga for English digital release in North America, with the first volume set to be released on July 19 of the same year.

Volume list

References

Further reading

External links
  
 

Comedy anime and manga
Fantasy anime and manga
Kodansha manga
Seinen manga
Slice of life anime and manga